The men's pole vault competition featured in the athletics programme at the 1976 Summer Olympics and was held at the Olympic Stadium in Montréal on 24 and 26 July. Twenty-seven athletes from 13 nations competed. The maximum number of athletes per nation had been set at 3 since the 1930 Olympic Congress.

All three medallists tied the Olympic record mark of 5.50 metres. Tadeusz Ślusarski of Poland and Antti Kalliomäki of Finland both cleared all heights up to 5.50 m with no misses; Ślusarski passed two heights more than Kalliomäki, and won on the basis of fewer vaults in accordance with the rules of the time. American Dave Roberts, who also cleared 5.50 m on his first try but had one miss from an earlier height, took the bronze medal.

Ślusarski's gold medal was Poland's first medal in the men's pole vault. Kalliomäki's silver was Finland's first medal since 1960 and matched the nation's best result to date (from 1948). Roberts's bronze was the worst result yet for the Americans, who had won the first 16 editions of the event and taken silver at the 17th in 1972.

Background

This was the 18th appearance of the event, which is one of 12 athletics events to have been held at every Summer Olympics. The returning finalists from the 1972 Games were fifth-place finisher Bruce Simpson of Canada, eighth-place finisher François Tracanelli of France, ninth-place finisher Ingemar Jernberg of Sweden, tenth-place finisher Wojciech Buciarski, and twelfth-place finishers Antti Kalliomäki and Tadeusz Ślusarski of Poland (each of whom had not cleared any height in the final). The favorites were David Roberts (the world record holder) and Earl Bell of the United States and Władysław Kozakiewicz of Poland.

Cuba was the only nation that made its pole vaulting debut in the event. The United States made its 18th appearance, the only nation to have competed at every Olympic men's pole vault to that point.

Competition format

The competition used the two-round format introduced in 1912, with results cleared between rounds. Vaulters received three attempts at each height. Ties were broken by the countback rule. At the time, total attempts was used after total misses.

In the qualifying round, the bar was set at 4.60 metres (which all vaulters passed on), 4.80 metres, 5.00 metres, and 5.10 metres. All vaulters clearing 5.10 metres advanced to the final. If fewer than 12 cleared that height, the top 12 (including ties) advanced.

In the final, the bar was set at 4.80 metres (which all vaulters passed on), 5.00 metres, 5.10 metres, 5.20 metres, and then increased by 5 centimetres as a time.

Records

Prior to the competition, the existing world and Olympic records were as follows.

The three medalists (Tadeusz Ślusarski, Antti Kalliomäki, and David Roberts) all matched the Olympic record at 5.50 metres; none were able to break it.

Schedule

Results

Qualifying

The qualification was set to 5.10 metres. A total of 20 athletes achieved this height.

Final

References

External links
Results

Pole vault
1976
Men's events at the 1976 Summer Olympics